Terna Medical College is a medical college located in Navi Mumbai, Maharashtra. It has 150 undergraduate seats for MBBS course. It is associated with STRS.

References

External links
 

Medical colleges in Maharashtra
Education in Navi Mumbai
Affiliates of Maharashtra University of Health Sciences
Educational institutions established in 1991
1991 establishments in Maharashtra